Baishan may refer to:

Places
Baishan prefecture-level city in Jilin province of the People's Republic of China
Baekdu Mountain (Chángbái Shān) source of city's name
Baishan Dam, arch-gravity dam on the Second Songhua River near the town of Baishanzhen

People
Baishan (Apache) (c. 1816 – 1857), a Chihenne (Mimbres) Apache chieftain of the Warm Springs Apache Band

Other
Baishan Fir; see Abies beshanzuensis

See also
Hunjiang City, former name of Baishan, Jilin, China
Hunjiang District, in Baishan, Jilin, China